The Regional Council of Réunion consists of 45 members.

Organization and composition

Regional assembly

Presidency 
Since 2 July 2021, the President of the Regional Council of Réunion has been Huguette Bello.

References
World Statesmen.org

External links
Official Website

Government of Réunion
Reunion, Regional Council
Politics of Réunion
Legislatures of Overseas France